Nukun Prachuapmo (25 July 1929 – 5 February 2023) was a Thai politician. He served as Minister of Transport from 1991 to March 1992 and again from June to September 1992. He was also governor of the Bank of Thailand from 1979 to 1984.

Prachuapmo died on 5 February 2023, at the age of 93.

References

1929 births
2023 deaths
Nukun Prachuapmo
Nukun Prachuapmo
Nukun Prachuapmo
Nukun Prachuapmo